Fried ice cream is a dessert made of a scoop of ice cream that is frozen hard, breaded or coated in a batter, and quickly deep-fried, creating a warm, crispy shell around the still-cold ice cream.

Origin 
There are conflicting stories about the dessert's origin. Some claim that it was first served during the 1893 Chicago World's Fair, where the ice cream sundae was also invented. Though in 1894, a Philadelphia company was given credit for its invention describing: "A small, solid [cake] of the ice cream is enveloped in a thin sheet of pie crust and then dipped into boiling lard or butter to cook the outside to a crisp. Served immediately, the ice cream is found to be as solidly frozen as it was first prepared." A third claim, beginning in the 1960s proposes that fried ice cream was invented by Japanese tempura.

Associations with national cuisines 
In the United States, fried ice cream has been associated with Asian cuisine, appearing in reviews of Chinese, Japanese, and Polynesian restaurants in the "Dining Out" section of the New York Times in the 1970s.

It also came to be associated with Mexican cuisine, in large part due to national chain Chi-Chi's adopting a fried ice cream made with tortillas and cinnamon as its "signature dessert" when it opened in the early 1980s.

In Australia, fried ice cream is strongly associated with Asian cuisine and particularly Australian Chinese cuisine. It is frequently served with caramel sauce.

The dessert is commonly made by taking a scoop of ice cream frozen well below the temperature at which ice cream is generally kept, possibly coating it in raw egg, rolling it in cornflakes or cookie crumbs, and briefly deep frying it. The extremely low temperature of the ice cream prevents it from melting while being fried. It may be sprinkled with cinnamon and sugar and a touch of peppermint, though whipped cream or honey may be used as well.

The Asian recipe usually uses tempura batter. Mexican versions use corn flakes, nuts, cookie crumbs, or tortillas for coating. Common flavors in Asian restaurants are green tea, vanilla, taro, and red bean.

In popular culture 
In the 1984 Scottish film Comfort and Joy, two branches of an Italian-Scottish family come to blows when the side known for its fish and chips starts selling ice cream under the name "Mr Bunny" in direct competition with the other branch, which is already selling ice cream under the brand "McCool." Local DJ Alan "Dickie" Bird successfully mediates a solution the radio station's Katy Pollock mention a Chinese delicacy called ice cream fritters. McCool and Mr Bunny thus embark on a joint venture to make and sell them under the trade name "Frosty Hots."

See also

 Deep Fried Mars Bar
 Fried milk
 List of Chinese desserts
 List of desserts

References

External links
 Fried ice cream @ The Food Timeline

Ice cream
Chinese desserts
Mexican desserts
American desserts